Paluszkiewicz is a  Polish surname. Notable people with the surname include:

Janusz Paluszkiewicz (1912–1990), Polish actor
Xavier Paluszkiewicz (born 1972), French politician

Polish-language surnames